BBC Radio Lancashire is the BBC's local radio station serving the county of Lancashire.

It broadcasts on FM, AM, DAB, digital TV and via BBC Sounds from studios on Darwen Street in Blackburn.

According to RAJAR, the station has a weekly audience of 163,000 listeners and a 5.2% share as of December 2022.

Transmitters 
BBC Radio Lancashire broadcasts on three FM transmitters. North Manchester, although nearby, can also pick up the signal. The station's other FM transmitters cover the eastern part of the county with an additional FM transmitter covering the Morecambe Bay area.

Beginning on 1 October 2001, the DAB signals have come from the EMAP Digital Central Lancashire 12A multiplex located at Winter Hill and Pendle Forest (near Nelson). Pendle Forest also started broadcasting BBC National DAB stations in April 2004.

In addition, BBC Radio Lancashire also broadcasts on Freeview TV channel 720 in the BBC North West region and streams online via BBC Sounds.

Until 17 May 2021, BBC Radio Lancashire had also broadcast on MW.

Programming
Local programming is produced and broadcast from the BBC's Blackburn studios from 6am – 10pm on Sundays – Fridays and from 6am – 2am on Saturdays.

The late show, airing from 10pm – 1am, is simulcast with BBC Radio Cumbria on Monday - Thursday, and originates from BBC Radio Merseyside on Fridays and BBC Radio Manchester on Saturdays and Sundays.

During the station's downtime, BBC Radio Lancashire simulcasts overnight programming from BBC Radio 5 Live and BBC Radio London.

Notable former presenters 

 Jim Bowen (deceased)
 Richard Hammond
 Tony Livesey (now at BBC Radio 5 Live)
 Andy Peebles 
 Martin Roberts (afterwards on Homes Under the Hammer)
 Norman Thomas

References

External links 

 BBC Radio Lancashire
 On the Wire.
 North West Radio – BBC Radio Lancashire Memories
 History of local radio in Lancashire.
 The former Radio Blackburn.
 MDS975's Transmitter Map.
 Hameldon Hill transmitter.
 Lancaster transmitter.
 Oxcliffe transmitter.
 Pendle Forest (Digital).
 Winter Hill transmitter.

Audio clips 
 2001 jingle
 Some old jingles and clips.

Radio stations established in 1971
Lancashire
Radio stations in Lancashire
1971 establishments in England